The DLV (DataLog with Disjunction, where the 
logical disjunction symbol V is used) system is a 
disjunctive logic programming system, implementing the 
stable model semantics under the answer set programming 
paradigm. It extends the Datalog language to allow the 
use of OR in the heads of rules.

Briefly, disjunctive Datalog is a variant of Datalog where disjunctions 
may appear in the rule heads; advanced versions also allow for negation 
in the bodies, which can be handled according to a semantics for negation 
in disjunctive logic programming.

Programming example 

The following is a program in Datalog extended with negation as failure:
smoker(john).
smoker(jack).

jogger(jill).
jogger(john).

healthy(X) :- jogger(X), \+ smoker(X).

This is the translation of the above program into DLV: Take Clark Completion and Clausal Form
smoker(X) <- X=john.
smoker(X) <- X=jack.
X=john v X=jack <- smoker(X).

jogger(X) <- X=jill.
jogger(X) <- X=john.
X=jill v X=john <- jogger(X).

healthy(X) v smoker(X) <- jogger(X).
jogger(X) <- healthy(X)
<- healthy(X) & smoker(X).
The following query has a single stable model:
?- healthy(X).
X = jill ;
No

References

External links 
 DLV user manual
 DLV Tutorial

Query languages
Logic programming languages